Journal is a Canadian short film television series which aired on CBC Television in 1977.

Premise
Independent short films were featured in this series. For example, Spence Bay was created in their northern community by a group of secondary school students and their teacher. Other films included Peggy Peacock and Jock Mlynek's North Hatley Antique Sale and Quebec Village; Mark Irwin's The Duel - Fencing, For The Love Of A Horse, Lacrosse, Sailaway, and Step By Step; and Tony Hall's Serpent River Paddlers.

This series was unrelated to CBC's news and current affairs series The Journal.

Scheduling
This 15-minute series was broadcast Sundays at 12:00 p.m. (Eastern) from 15 May to 25 September 1977.

External links
 

1977 Canadian television series debuts
1977 Canadian television series endings
CBC Television original programming